Freedom Band is the fourth studio album by American Latin hip hop group Delinquent Habits, released in 2003. The single, "U Don't Own Me", samples Lesley Gore's notable song.

Critical reception
The Plain Dealer wrote that Delinquent Habits "brings the noise on its fourth album, with 14 charged originals produced solely by the group." AllMusic called Freedom Band "a party album," writing that "the group mixes a contemporary sound with traces of Latin horns and guitars."

Track listing

References

2003 albums
Delinquent Habits albums